Prentice Penny (born December 1, 1973) is an American producer, writer, and director. He is best known as the showrunner for the HBO series Insecure. He is the writer and director of the Netflix film Uncorked. He was the creator and host of the show Upscale with Prentice Penny. He is also known for his roles as writer and producer on the series Brooklyn Nine-Nine, The Hustle, and Scrubs.

Early life
Prentice grew up in the Windsor Hill neighborhood of Los Angeles. His father ran a furniture business started by his grandfather in Compton. His mother, Brenda J. Penny, is a judge for the Los Angeles County Superior Court. He graduated in 1995, from the University of Southern California's screenwriting program where he was a member of the African American Cinema Association. He worked as a substitute teacher before getting his first writing job in television.

Career
Prentice began his professional career as a writer's trainee on the show Girlfriends where he eventually became a staff writer. He moved on to work as a writer and Co-Producer on the series Do Not Disturb, where he notes he was the only Black writer on the series.  He then moved on to co-produce on the series Scrubs, before gaining his first producer credit on the series Breaking In. In 2013 he joined The Hustle as their executive producer. He then went on to join Brooklyn Nine-Nine as a co-executive producer and writer. In 2017 he created, produced and starred in the series Upscale with Prentice Penny, a lifestyle series focusing on conscious consumption.
In 2016 he became the showrunner for Insecure on HBO a role which he's maintained for all seasons of the series. In 2020 Insecure was nominated for eight Emmy Award nominations for its fourth season, including the Emmy Award for Outstanding Comedy Series.

In March 2020, his first feature film Uncorked, a father/son story of an African-American man attempting to become a sommelier, premiered on Netflix.

As of July 2020, Penny had several new projects in the works. He will be partnering with Chernin Entertainment and Netflix to direct a holiday film, the idea for which came from Penny and his wife. He said, "When my wife Tasha and I came up with the idea, we felt that African-American movies centered around Christmas never got to play in the same ‘magical’ sandbox that traditionally white movies do, like The Santa Clause or Elf. We wanted to see images of ourselves portrayed in this genre and create a movie that black families could enjoy having themselves represented in for generations." He is also working with HBO to develop two new series: The Untamed, a culturally diverse epic fantasy based on a series of comic books set in the Asunda universe; and queens, a show set in New York City and focusing on the lives of immigrant women.

In 2021, Penny partnered with comedian Sam Jay to create Pause with Sam Jay for HBO and serves as Executive Producer. The show was renewed in 2021 for a second season. It is confirmed that he will have an overall deal with Onyx Collective.

Filmography

Film

Television

Personal life
Prentice is married to attorney Tasha Penny, whom he met in college at the University of Southern California. They have three children.

References

External links

1973 births
Living people
21st-century African-American people
21st-century African-American writers
21st-century American male writers
21st-century American screenwriters
African-American film directors
African-American screenwriters
Film directors from Los Angeles
Screenwriters from California
Television producers from California
Writers from Los Angeles